Bjørn Lidin Hansen (11 June 1989 – 25 October 2016) was a Norwegian footballer who played one match in the Norwegian Premier League for Tromsø, and also played senior football for Tromsdalen and Lyn. He also played seven youth internationals for Norway.

Football career 
Hansen was born in Kiruna, Sweden, to a Norwegian father and Swedish mother. The family soon relocated to Norway; first to Storslett and around 1992–93 to Tromsø. He played youth football in Stakkevollan IL and IF Fløya. He then moved home to play for the youth team of Tromsø IL.

Drafted into the first team, Hansen made his debut in the Norwegian Premier League on 12 July 2008, in the game between Aalesund and Tromsø, as a 90th-minute substitute for Morten Moldskred. This turned out to be his only first-team match for Tromsø; he left the club in July 2009, choosing to take a sabbatical from football. In April 2010, he was close to signing with First Division side Sarpsborg 08, before ending up signing a contract with Tromsdalen. He left Tromsdalen after the 2012 season and rejoined Lyn, then a 2. divisjon team, the following spring.

Illness and death
In the spring of 2015, Hansen was diagnosed with Ewing's sarcoma, a rare form of cancer. He was declared cancer-free about a year later, and successfully returned to Lyn, playing his first match after the cancer battle on 10 September 2016.

Hansen died on 25 October 2016. His family revealed that he had suffered from constant pain, fatigue and depression after his cancer recovery, and according to his obituary, he "could not bear to live with the pain, and chose death over life."

References

1989 births
2016 suicides
Sportspeople from Tromsø
Norwegian people of Swedish descent
Norwegian footballers
Norway youth international footballers
Lyn Fotball players
Tromsø IL players
Tromsdalen UIL players
Eliteserien players
Norwegian First Division players
Association football midfielders
Suicides in Norway